The Romanian Baseball and Softball Federation is the national governing body of baseball and softball in Romania. The federation was established on 4 February 1990.

The Romanian Baseball and Softball Federation is responsible for the national baseball team and overseeing the Romanian Baseball League.

History
Oină, a traditional Romanian sport, similar to baseball, has been practiced in Romania since the 14th century. The RBSF was established on 4 February 1990 as the Romanian Baseball Federation. In 1993, the RBF started sponsoring softball and changed its name to Romanian Baseball and Softball Federation.

Presidents
1990–1997: Aurică Stoian
1997–2001: Marian Ciocârlan
2001–2009: Vasile Molan
2009–2012: Valer Toma
2012–2022: Andrei Mirescu
2022–present: Cristian Manea

References

1990 establishments in Romania
Romania
Baseball in Romania
Sports organizations established in 1990
Softball organizations
Baseball
Softball in Romania